Espiridiona Bonifacio y de Castro (May 1, 1872 – May 26, 1956) was a Filipino Katipunera. She was one of the first female members of Confederation established by her older brother Andres Bonifacio. The others were her older brothers Ciriaco and Procopio Bonifacio.

Family background
Bonifacio was born in Tondo, Manila. Her father was Santiago Bonifacio of Taguig, a tailor who served as a teniente mayor of Tondo, Manila. Her mother was Catalina de Castro, a native of Cabangan, Zambales, a mestiza born of a Spanish father and a Filipino-Chinese mother who was a supervisor at a cigarette factory. She was the fourth of six children. Her siblings were Andrés, Ciriaco, Procopio, Troadio and Maxima.

Her life
Her nickname since she was a teenager was “Nonay”; her grandchildren still call her Lola Nonay. She joined the revolution as a teenager, going with either the group or hers brothers wherever they went. Her older brothers were her de facto parents. She hid bullets in the pots she cooked rice in and hid guns under her skirt. She took care of the wounded and sick Katipuneros and cooked for them.

Entering the Katipunan
The women's chapter of the Katipunan was formed in July 1893. There were only around 30 women members of the Katipunan, limited to wives, daughters and close relatives of Katipuneros.

Her agony
The Bonifacio siblings were orphaned at an early age and Andrés had to act as the family's breadwinner. Nonay, as a teenager, was dependent on her brothers for guidance. Her three older brothers were all part of the armed struggle.

Marriage
In 1893, when she was seventeen years old, she married Teodoro Plata, one of the founders of the Katipunan. She was widowed when Plata was executed in Bagumbayan in 1896 when the Spaniards discovered the Katipunan.

Death
She died on May 26, 1956, in Paco, Manila, and was interred at the Manila South Cemetery.

In popular culture
 Portrayed by Isabel Oli in the 2014 film, Bonifacio: Ang Unang Pangulo.

See also
 Melchora Aquino
 Hilaria Aguinaldo
 Trinidad Tecson
 Gregoria de Jesús
 Agueda Kahabagan
 Agueda Esteban
 Nazaria Lagos
 Teresa Magbanua
 Marina Dizon
 Patrocinio Gamboa

References

1872 births
1956 deaths
Filipino revolutionaries
Filipino people of Chinese descent
Filipino people of Spanish descent
Katipunan members
People from Tondo, Manila
People of the Philippine Revolution
People of Spanish colonial Philippines
Burials at the Manila South Cemetery